Work of Art: The Next Great Artist is an American reality competition show that aired on the cable television network Bravo, in which up-and-coming artists compete for a solo exhibition at the Brooklyn Museum and a cash prize of $100,000. The show was produced by Pretty Matches Productions and Magical Elves Productions, the same company that created Project Runway and Top Chef. The series premiered on June 9, 2010. Work of Art was renewed for a second season in September 2010 which began on October 12, 2011.

Seasons

Season 1 (2010)

Contestants

: Age at the time of filming.
: City of residence at the time of filming.

Contestant progress

: John had his book cover published by Penguin Books; he did not receive immunity.
: Beginning with this episode, the winners no longer received immunity.
 (WINNER) The artist won Work of Art: The Next Great Artist.
 (RUNNER-UP) The artist was a runner-up for the season.
 (WIN) The artist won that episode's challenge.
 (HIGH) The artist was selected as one of the top entries in the challenge, but did not win.
 (IN) The artist neither won nor lost that week's challenge. They also were not up to be eliminated.
 (LOW) The artist was selected as one of the bottom entries in the challenge, but was not eliminated.
 (OUT) The artist lost that week's challenge and was out of the competition.

Episodes

Season 2 (2011)

Contestants

: Age at the time of filming.
: City of residence at the time of filming.

Contestant progress

: Young had a two-page spread published in Entertainment Weekly; he did not receive immunity.
 (WINNER) The artist won the season of Work of Art: The Next Great Artist.
 (RUNNER-UP) The artist was a runner-up for the season.
 (WIN) The artist won that episode's challenge.
 (HIGH) The artist was selected as one of the top entries in the challenge, but did not win.
 (IN) The artist neither won nor lost that week's challenge. They also were not up to be eliminated.
 (LOW) The artist was selected as one of the bottom entries in the challenge, but was not eliminated.
 (OUT) The artist lost that week's challenge and was out of the competition.

Episodes

Future seasons

Work of Art's renewal status was unclear as the second season concluded: In late December 2011, Judge Bill Powers wrote that "We will have to see if our work of art worked for Bravo." Jerry Saltz, another Work of Art judge, announced via his Vulture blog that he would not return for a third season of the show. The uncertainty as to Work of Art's fate on Bravo was somewhat resolved when the Gallerist reported the show's cancellation in August 2012.  The LA Times reported that while Bravo would not officially confirm the cancellation, "a source close to the channel said it was "unlikely" that the show would return for a third season on Bravo." Work of Art's producers as of August 2012 were approaching other television networks in the hopes of continuing the show's run elsewhere.

References

External links
Bravo Says Encore to "Work of Art" Reality Show
NY Times Review of Abdi's Brooklyn Museum Exhibition

2010s American reality television series
2010 American television series debuts
2011 American television series endings
Bravo (American TV network) original programming
English-language television shows
Television series by Magical Elves
Brooklyn Museum
Television series about art
Reality competition television series